On December 9, 1949, the National Football League absorbed three teams from the All-America Football Conference (Cleveland Browns, San Francisco 49ers, Baltimore Colts).

The NFL held a dispersal draft on June 2, 1950 for players from the All-America Football Conference teams of the New York Yankees, Buffalo Bills, Chicago Hornets, and Los Angeles Dons. Most of the players from the Yankees had already been divided between the New York Giants and New York Yanks (formerly Bulldogs).

The draft order was determined by the order of finish (worst to best) of the 1949 season. Therefore, the draft order was: 
Baltimore Colts (AAFC)
New York Yanks (New York Bulldogs in 1949) 
Green Bay Packers
Detroit Lions 
Washington Redskins 
New York Giants 
Pittsburgh Steelers
Chicago Cardinals (tied with the Steelers)
Chicago Bears 
San Francisco 49ers (AAFC) (tied with the Bears)
Los Angeles Rams
Cleveland Browns (AAFC)
Philadelphia Eagles

Since the Colts and the Packers were the weakest teams, they were given a total of five extra draft picks each, divided at the end of rounds: 3 (2 picks), 5 (1 pick), 7 (1 pick) and 9 (1 pick).

Teams chose 140 players during the ten-round selection meeting.

Round 1
{|class="wikitable sortable sortable" style="width: 100%"
|-
!style="background:#A8BDEC;" width=7%|Pick # !!width=42% style="background:#A8BDEC;"|Player !!width=15% style="background:#A8BDEC;"|Position!!width=16% style="background:#A8BDEC;"|NFL team  !!width=20% style="background:#A8BDEC;"|AAFC team !!width=20% style="background:#A8BDEC;"|College
|-
|align=center|1||Chester Mutryn|| HB ||Baltimore Colts|| Buffalo Bills||
|-
|align=center|2||George Taliaferro|| HB|| New York Yanks ||Los Angeles Dons||
|-
|align=center|3||Billy Grimes|| HB|| Green Bay Packers ||Los Angeles Dons||
|-
|align=center|4|| bgcolor="#FFCC00"|Robert Hoernschemeyer||HB|| Detroit Lions||Chicago Hornets||
|-
|align=center|5||Jim Spavital|| FB||Washington Redskins|| Los Angeles Dons||
|-
|align=center|6||John Rapacz||OL||New York Giants||Chicago Hornets||
|-
|align=center|7||Buddy Tinsley||T|| Pittsburgh Steelers||Los Angeles Dons||
|-
|align=center|8||Robert Reinhard||T||Chicago Cardinals||Los Angeles Dons||
|-
|align=center|9||Harper Davis||HB||Chicago Bears||Los Angeles Dons||
|-
|align=center|10||Knox Ramsey||G||San Francisco 49ers||Los Angeles Dons||
|-
|align=center|11||Arthur Statuto||C||Los Angeles Rams||Buffalo Bills||
|-
|align=center|12||Hal Herring||C||Cleveland Browns||Buffalo Bills||
|-
|align=center|13||Lindy Pearson||HB||Philadelphia Eagles|| ||
|}

Round 2
{|class="wikitable sortable sortable" style="width: 100%"
|-
!style="background:#A8BDEC;" width=7%|Pick # !!width=42% style="background:#A8BDEC;"|Player !!width=15% style="background:#A8BDEC;"|Position!!width=16% style="background:#A8BDEC;"|NFL team  !!width=20% style="background:#A8BDEC;"|AAFC team !!width=20% style="background:#A8BDEC;"|College
|-
|align=center|14||Robert Livingstone||HB||Baltimore Colts||Buffalo Bills||
|-
|align=center|15||Nate Johnson||T||New York Yanks||Chicago Hornets||
|-
|align=center|16||Alton Baldwin||E||Green Bay Packers||Buffalo Bills||
|-
|align=center|17||bgcolor="#CCFFCC"|Louis Creekmur||T||Detroit Lions|| ||
|-
|align=center|18||bgcolor="#FFCC00"|Chuck Drazenovich||FB||Washington Redskins|| ||
|-
|align=center|19||Ollie Cline||FB||New York Giants||Buffalo Bills||
|-
|align=center|20||Thomas Ray Richeson||G||Pittsburgh Steelers||Chicago Hornets||
|-
|align=center|21||Martin Wendell||G||Chicago Cardinals||Chicago Hornets||
|-
|align=center|22||Fred Negus||C	||Chicago Bears||Chicago Hornets||
|-
|align=center|23||Edgar Henke||T||San Francisco 49ers||Los Angeles Dons||
|-
|align=center|24||Victor Vasicek||G||Los Angeles Rams||Buffalo Bills||
|-
|align=center|25||bgcolor="#FFCC00"|Len Ford||E||Cleveland Browns||Los Angeles Dons||
|-
|align=center|26||Jerry Krall||FB||Philadelphia Eagles||Los Angeles Dons||
|}

Round 3
{|class="wikitable sortable sortable" style="width: 100%"
|-
!style="background:#A8BDEC;" width=7%|Pick # !!width=42% style="background:#A8BDEC;"|Player !!width=15% style="background:#A8BDEC;"|Position!!width=16% style="background:#A8BDEC;"|NFL team  !!width=20% style="background:#A8BDEC;"|AAFC team !!width=20% style="background:#A8BDEC;"|College
|-
|align=center|27||Albin Collins||HB||Baltimore Colts||Chicago Hornets||
|-
|align=center|28||Dan Edwards||E||New York Yanks||Chicago Hornets||
|-
|align=center|29||Homer Paine||T||Green Bay Packers||Chicago Hornets||
|-
|align=center|30||Bob Jensen||E||Detroit Lions||Chicago Hornets||
|-
|align=center|31||Roland Dale||T||Washington Redskins||||
|-
|align=center|32||Vince Mazza||E||New York Giants||Buffalo Bills||
|-
|align=center|33||Tom McWilliams||HB||Pittsburgh Steelers||Los Angeles Dons||
|-
|align=center|34||Ray Ramsey||HB||Chicago Cardinals||Chicago Hornets||
|-
|align=center|35||James Clark||T||Chicago Bears	|| ||
|-
|align=center|36||Odell Stautzenberger||G||San Francisco 49ers||Buffalo Bills||
|-
|align=center|37||Dick Wilkins||E||Los Angeles Rams||Los Angeles Dons||
|-
|align=center|38||Bill Schroll||HB||Cleveland Browns||Buffalo Bills||
|-
|align=center|39||George Pastre||T||Philadelphia Eagles	||Los Angeles Dons||
|}

Extra picks
{|class="wikitable sortable sortable" style="width: 100%"
|-
!style="background:#A8BDEC;" width=7%|Pick # !!width=42% style="background:#A8BDEC;"|Player !!width=15% style="background:#A8BDEC;"|Position!!width=16% style="background:#A8BDEC;"|NFL team  !!width=20% style="background:#A8BDEC;"|AAFC team !!width=20% style="background:#A8BDEC;"|College
|-
|align=center|40||bgcolor="#CCFFCC"|Arthur Donovan||G	||Baltimore Colts||Buffalo Bills||Boston College
|-
|align=center|41||James Lukens||E||Green Bay Packers||Buffalo Bills||
|-
|align=center|42||Edward King||G||Baltimore Colts||Buffalo Bills||
|-
|align=center|43||bgcolor="#FFCC00"|Abner Wimberly||E||Green Bay Packers||Los Angeles Dons||
|}

Round 4
{|class="wikitable sortable sortable" style="width: 100%"
|-
!style="background:#A8BDEC;" width=7%|Pick # !!width=42% style="background:#A8BDEC;"|Player !!width=15% style="background:#A8BDEC;"|Position!!width=16% style="background:#A8BDEC;"|NFL team  !!width=20% style="background:#A8BDEC;"|AAFC team !!width=20% style="background:#A8BDEC;"|College
|-
|align=center|44||George Buksar||FB||Baltimore Colts||Chicago Hornets||Purdue
|-
|align=center|45||Johnny Clowes||T||New York Yanks||Chicago Hornets||William & Mary
|-
|align=center|46||Wilbur Volz||HB||Green Bay Packers||Buffalo Bills||
|-
|align=center|47||William Kay||T||Detroit Lions||Buffalo Bills||
|-
|align=center|48||Lloyd Eisenberg||T||Washington Redskins||Los Angeles Dons||
|-
|align=center|49||Alfred Schmid||E||New York Giants|| ||
|-
|align=center|50||Dan Dworsky||C||Pittsburgh Steelers||Los Angeles Dons||
|-
|align=center|51||Ted Hazelwood||T||Chicago Cardinals||Chicago Hornets||
|-
|align=center|52||Glenn Dobbs||QB-HB||Chicago Bears||Los Angeles Dons||
|-
|align=center|53||Earl Howell||HB||San Francisco 49ers||Los Angeles Dons||
|-
|align=center|54||Wade Walker||T||Los Angeles Rams||Buffalo Bills||
|-
|align=center|55||Alex Wizbicki||HB||Cleveland Browns||Buffalo Bills||
|-
|align=center|56||Paul Gibson||E||Philadelphia Eagles||Buffalo Bills||
|}

Round 5
{|class="wikitable sortable sortable" style="width: 100%"
|-
!style="background:#A8BDEC;" width=7%|Pick # !!width=42% style="background:#A8BDEC;"|Player !!width=15% style="background:#A8BDEC;"|Position!!width=16% style="background:#A8BDEC;"|NFL team  !!width=20% style="background:#A8BDEC;"|AAFC team !!width=20% style="background:#A8BDEC;"|College
|-
|align=center|57||Robert Oristaglio||E||Baltimore Colts||Buffalo Bills||
|-
|align=center|58||Bob Kennedy||FB||New York Yanks||New York Yankees||
|-
|align=center|59||John Kerns||T||Green Bay Packers||Buffalo Bills||
|-
|align=center|60||Richard Rifenberg||E||Detroit Lions||New York Yankees||
|-
|align=center|61||bgcolor="#FFCC00"|Hardy Brown||FB||Washington Redskins||Chicago Hornets||
|-
|align=center|62||Joe Sullivan||QB||New York Giants|| ||
|-
|align=center|63||Herbert St. John||G||Pittsburgh Steelers||Chicago Hornets||
|-
|align=center|64||Jim Still||QB||Chicago Cardinals||Buffalo Bills||
|-
|align=center|65||Al Beasley||G||Chicago Bears||New York Yankees||
|-
|align=center|66||John Brown||C||San Francisco 49ers||Los Angeles Dons||
|-
|align=center|67||Ernest Williamson||T||Los Angeles Rams||Los Angeles Dons||
|-
|align=center|68||Walter Clay||FB||Cleveland Browns||Los Angeles Dons||
|-
|align=center|69||Joseph Sutton||HB||Philadelphia Eagles||Buffalo Bills||
|}

Extra picks

{|class="wikitable sortable sortable" style="width: 100%"
|-
!style="background:#A8BDEC;" width=7%|Pick # !!width=42% style="background:#A8BDEC;"|Player !!width=15% style="background:#A8BDEC;"|Position!!width=16% style="background:#A8BDEC;"|NFL team  !!width=20% style="background:#A8BDEC;"|AAFC team !!width=20% style="background:#A8BDEC;"|College
|-
|align=center|70||Robert Deuber||HB||Baltimore Colts|| ||
|-
|align=center|71|||Ted Cook|| E|| Green Bay Packers|| ||
|}

Round 6
{|class="wikitable sortable sortable" style="width: 100%"
|-
!style="background:#A8BDEC;" width=7%|Pick # !!width=42% style="background:#A8BDEC;"|Player !!width=15% style="background:#A8BDEC;"|Position!!width=16% style="background:#A8BDEC;"|NFL team  !!width=20% style="background:#A8BDEC;"|AAFC team !!width=20% style="background:#A8BDEC;"|College
|-
|align=center|72||Michael Perrotti||T||	Baltimore Colts||Los Angeles Dons||
|-
|align=center|73||Chester Adams||T||New York Yanks||Buffalo Bills||
|-
|align=center|74||Jason A. Bailey||T||Green Bay Packers||Chicago Hornets||
|-
|align=center|75||Joyce Pipkin||E||Detroit Lions||Los Angeles Dons||
|-
|align=center|76||Ed Hirsch||LB||Washington Redskins||Buffalo Bills||
|-
|align=center|77||Richard Woodard||C||New York Giants||Los Angeles Dons||
|-
|align=center|78||George Grimes||HB||Pittsburgh Steelers||Buffalo Bills||
|-
|align=center|79||Jim Turner||T||Chicago Cardinals||Chicago Hornets||
|-
|align=center|80||John Cunningham||E||Chicago Bears|| ||
|-
|align=center|81||George Murphy||QB||San Francisco 49ers||Los Angeles Dons||
|-
|align=center|82||Bill Renna||C||Los Angeles Rams||Los Angeles Dons||
|-
|align=center|83||George Strohmeyer||C||Cleveland Browns||Chicago Hornets||
|-
|align=center|84||Hosea Rodgers||FB||Philadelphia Eagles||Los Angeles Dons||
|}

Round 7
{|class="wikitable sortable sortable" style="width: 100%"
|-
!style="background:#A8BDEC;" width=7%|Pick # !!width=42% style="background:#A8BDEC;"|Player !!width=15% style="background:#A8BDEC;"|Position!!width=16% style="background:#A8BDEC;"|NFL team  !!width=20% style="background:#A8BDEC;"|AAFC team !!width=20% style="background:#A8BDEC;"|College
|-
|align=center|85||Bill Gompers||HB||Baltimore Colts||Buffalo Bills||
|-
|align=center|86||Paul Crowe||HB||New York Yanks||Los Angeles Dons||
|-
|align=center|87||Denny Crawford||T||Green Bay Packers||New York Yankees||
|-
|align=center|88||George Benigni||E||Detroit Lions||Chicago Hornets||
|-
|align=center|89||Ed Smith||B||Washington Redskins|| ||
|-
|align=center|90||Henry Foldberg||E||New York Giants||Chicago Hornets||
|-
|align=center|91||Ben Verick||FB||Pittsburgh Steelers|| ||
|-
|align=center|92||Alex Sarkisian||C||Chicago Cardinals|| ||Northwestern
|-
|align=center|93||John Donaldson||HB||Chicago Bears||Los Angeles Dons||
|-
|align=center|94||John Maskas||T||San Francisco 49ers||Buffalo Bills||
|-
|align=center|95||Jack Swaner||HB||Los Angeles Rams||Chicago Hornets||
|-
|align=center|96||Lynn Chewing||FB||Cleveland Browns||New York Yankees||
|-
|align=center|97||Don Panciera||QB||Philadelphia Eagles||New York Yankees||
|}

Extra picks
{|class="wikitable sortable sortable" style="width: 100%"
|-
!style="background:#A8BDEC;" width=7%|Pick # !!width=42% style="background:#A8BDEC;"|Player !!width=15% style="background:#A8BDEC;"|Position!!width=16% style="background:#A8BDEC;"|NFL team  !!width=20% style="background:#A8BDEC;"|AAFC team !!width=20% style="background:#A8BDEC;"|College
|-
|align=center|98||William Stanton||E||Baltimore Colts||Buffalo Bills||
|-
|align=center|99||Carl Schuette||C||Green Bay Packers||Buffalo Bills||
|}

Round 8
{|class="wikitable sortable sortable" style="width: 100%"
|-
!style="background:#A8BDEC;" width=7%|Pick # !!width=42% style="background:#A8BDEC;"|Player !!width=15% style="background:#A8BDEC;"|Position!!width=16% style="background:#A8BDEC;"|NFL team  !!width=20% style="background:#A8BDEC;"|AAFC team !!width=20% style="background:#A8BDEC;"|College
|-
|align=center|100||Veto Kissell||FB||Baltimore Colts||Buffalo Bills||
|-
|align=center|101||John "Mickey" Colmer||FB||New York Yanks||New York Yankees||
|-
|align=center|102||Zygmont Czarobski||T||Green Bay Packers||Chicago Hornets||
|-
|align=center|103||Gerald Morrical||T||Detroit Lions||New York Yankees||
|-
|align=center|104||Leon McLaughlin||C||Washington Redskins|Los Angeles Dons||
|-
|align=center|105||Robert Heck||E||New York Giants||Chicago Hornets||Purdue
|-
|align=center|106||James Pearcy||G||Pittsburgh Steelers||Chicago Hornets||
|-
|align=center|107||Phil O'Reilly||T||Chicago Cardinals|| ||Purdue
|-
|align=center|108||George Maddock||T||Chicago Bears||Chicago Hornets||
|-
|align=center|109||Paul Cleary||E||San Francisco 49ers||Chicago Hornets||
|-
|align=center|110||Richard Scott||C||Los Angeles Rams||Brooklyn Dodgers||
|-
|align=center|111||Paul Patterson||HB||Cleveland Browns||Chicago Hornets||
|-
|align=center|112||Caleb Washington||C||Philadelphia Eagles||Brooklyn Dodgers||
|}

Round 9
{|class="wikitable sortable sortable" style="width: 100%"
|-
!style="background:#A8BDEC;" width=7%|Pick # !!width=42% style="background:#A8BDEC;"|Player !!width=15% style="background:#A8BDEC;"|Position!!width=16% style="background:#A8BDEC;"|NFL team  !!width=20% style="background:#A8BDEC;"|AAFC team !!width=20% style="background:#A8BDEC;"|College
|-
|align=center|113||Robert Hatch||QB-HB||Baltimore Colts	|| ||
|-
|align=center|114||Spec Sanders||HB||New York Yanks||New York Yankees||
|-
|align=center|115||Victor Schleich||T||Green Bay Packers||Chicago Rockets||
|-
|align=center|116||Warren Huey||E||Detroit Lions||Chicago Hornets||
|-
|align=center|117||Murray Alexander||E||Washington Redskins||Brooklyn Dodgers||
|-
|align=center|118||Henry Kalver||T||New York Giants|| ||
|-
|align=center|119||Robert Forbes||HB||Pittsburgh Steelers|| ||
|-
|align=center|120||Ralph Sazio||T||Chicago Cardinals||Buffalo Bills||
|-
|align=center|121||Robert Leonetti||G||Chicago Bears||Buffalo Bills||
|-
|align=center|122||Ernest Tolman||E||San Francisco 49ers||New York Yankees||
|-
|align=center|123||Edward Kelley||T||Los Angeles Rams||Los Angeles Dons||
|-
|align=center|124||William Reinhard||HB||Cleveland Browns||Los Angeles Dons||
|-
|align=center|125||Carmen Falcone||QB||Philadelphia Eagles|| ||
|}

Extra picks

{|class="wikitable sortable sortable" style="width: 100%"
|-
!style="background:#A8BDEC;" width=7%|Pick # !!width=42% style="background:#A8BDEC;"|Player !!width=15% style="background:#A8BDEC;"|Position!!width=16% style="background:#A8BDEC;"|NFL team  !!width=20% style="background:#A8BDEC;"|AAFC team !!width=20% style="background:#A8BDEC;"|College
|-
|align=center|126||Lou Tomasetti||FB||Baltimore Colts||Buffalo Bills||Bucknell
|-
|align=center|127||Paul Duke||C||Green Bay Packers||New York Yankees||
|}

Round 10
{|class="wikitable sortable sortable" style="width: 100%"
|-
!style="background:#A8BDEC;" width=7%|Pick # !!width=42% style="background:#A8BDEC;"|Player !!width=15% style="background:#A8BDEC;"|Position!!width=16% style="background:#A8BDEC;"|NFL team  !!width=20% style="background:#A8BDEC;"|AAFC team !!width=20% style="background:#A8BDEC;"|College
|-
|align=center|128||Lou Agase||T||Baltimore Colts||Chicago Hornets||Illinois
|-
|align=center|129||Tommy Colella||HB||New York Yanks||Buffalo Bills||
|-
|align=center|130||R.M. Patterson||T||Green Bay Packers||Chicago Hornets||
|-
|align=center|131||Ray Coates||HB||Detroit Lions||New York Giants||
|-
|align=center|132||Dewey Nelson||HB||Washington Redskins|| ||
|-
|align=center|133||Dwight Eddleman||HB||New York Giants|| ||
|-
|align=center|134||Robert Meinert||LB||Pittsburgh Steelers||Los Angeles Dons||
|-
|align=center|135||Vaughn Mancha||C||Chicago Cardinals|| ||
|-	
|align=center|136||George Bernhardt||G||Chicago Bears||Chicago Hornets||Illinois
|-
|align=center|137||Dick Lorenz||E||San Francisco 49ers||Los Angeles Dons||
|-
|align=center|138||Dale Armstrong||E||Los Angeles Rams||Brooklyn Dodgers||
|-
|align=center|139||Lewis Holder||E||Cleveland Browns||Los Angeles Dons||
|-
|align=center|140||Gil Johnson||QB-HB||Philadelphia Eagles||New York Yankees||
|}

References

External links
 1950 Allocation Draft

National Football League Draft
All-America Football Conference